Those of the Unlight is the title of the second studio album by Swedish black metal band Marduk.

It was released in October 1993 by Osmose Productions, and reissued in digipak format on April 4, 2006 by Regain Records, with bonus videos of three songs performed live on August 12, 1993.

It is the first album the band produced in a proper black metal style, as opposed to the blackened death metal approach of their 1992 debut, Dark Endless.

Those of the Unlight is the last Marduk release to feature Joakim Göthberg on drums, as he would purely assume vocal duties by the next studio album, Opus Nocturne. It also the last studio release to have two guitarists, as Devo Andersson was not in Marduk after this release, although he did return in 2004 as the bassist.

"Burn My Coffin" was originally the title for a track that would appear on Mayhem's De Mysteriis Dom Sathanas, the title was changed by Per Yngve Ohlin before he died. Marduk later adopted the title for the song on this album.

Track listing

Personnel

Marduk
 Joakim Af Gravf (Joakim Göthberg) – vocals, drums
 Morgan Håkansson (Patrik Niclas Morgan Håkansson) – guitar
 Devo Andersson (Dan Everth Magnus Andersson) – guitar
 B. War (Roger Svensson) – bass

Guest
 Dan Swanö – mixing

References

1993 albums
Marduk (band) albums
Osmose Productions albums
Regain Records albums